Midnight Magic may refer to:

 Midnight Magic (novel), by Avi
 Midnight Magic (Atari 2600), a video game
 Midnight Magic (album), by The Commodores

See also
David's Midnight Magic, a 1982 pinball video game